Rhipidarctia flaviceps is a moth in the family Erebidae. It was described by George Hampson in 1898. It is found in Cameroon, the Democratic Republic of the Congo, Equatorial Guinea, Nigeria and Togo.

References

Moths described in 1898
Syntomini